The First Battle of Wawer was fought on 19 and 20 February 1831, between Poland and Russia. Polish forces, led by Jan Skrzynecki, defeated Russian 1st Corps, commanded by Hans Karl von Diebitsch. After the battle, Polish commanders did not receive any reinforcements, so the victory was not decisive.

References

Conflicts in 1831
Battles of the November Uprising
Military history of Warsaw
February 1831 events
1831 in Poland